This is a bibliography of the works of Ali Khamenei, Iran's supreme leader. Generally, his works can be classified into 4 periods of time:

The first period, related-correspondence to the period of the revolutionary activities since 1963-1979, that most of Khamenei's scientific-activity took place in the period and consists of approximately 10 compilations and translations;

The second period is from the victory of the revolution to the beginning of the presidency (1979-1982);

The third period is about his presidency during the years 1981-1989;

The fourth period is in regards to the leadership term of Seyyed Ali Khamenei since 1989 till now.

Seyyed Ali Khamenei's books can be divided into 4 categories -- in a category based on the type of writing; including: authorial researches, books collected from lessons/lectures, translations, and translation-compilations.

Compilations 
Seyyed Ali Khamenei's compilations consist of the works, such as:
 Pishwayeh-Sadeq (i.e. Honest leader)
 A report from the seminary of Mashhad
 Four main books of Biographical-Evaluation
 Az Zharfaye Namaz (From the depths of prayer)
 An Outline of Islamic Thought in the Quran
 Goftari Dar Babe Sabr (A speech about patience)
 Ruhe-Tawhid, Nafye Obudiate GheireKhoda (The Spirit of Monotheism, Rejection of non-God Obedience)
Etc.

Translations 
 Al-Mustaqbal Le-Haz-al-Din (The future in the realm of Islam)
 Solh al-Hassan (the peace of [Imam] al-Hassan)
 Al-Moshkelat Wa Moshkelat al-Hezarah
 Tafseer Fi Zelal al-Quran

Compilation-translation 
Kafah al-Moslemin Fi Tahrir al-Hend, (Arabic: کفاح المسلمین فی تحریر الهند), is a work, translated and compiled by Seyyed Ali Khamenei (the author: Abdol-Monaem al-Nemr), published in 1968.

Collected by others 
Among the works of Seyyed Ali Khamenei's works which have been collected by others, are as follows:
 A 250 Years Old Person
 Palestine (2011 book)
 Javdaneh Tarikh (Immortal History)
 Expression of the Qur'an Interpretation of Surah Mujadaleh
 The book of “Khaterat-e Jebhe-ye-1”
The book of “Khaterat-e Jebhe-ye 1”, (Persian: خاطرات جبهه-۱) including the interview text of Iran’s second channel of Islamic Republic of Iran Broadcasting with Seyyed Ali Khamenei on 19 September 1984 – on the occasion of the fourth anniversary of Iran-Iraq War. He mentions memoirs from the commencing months of the war. And is also in regards to the liberation of Susangerd.

 The book of "Jelvehaye Ma’navi wa Erfani-ye Ashoora"
Jelvehaye Ma’navi wa Erfani-ye Ashoora (Spiritual and Mystical Manifestations of Ashura), (Persian: جلوه های معنوی و عرفانی عاشورا) consists of two speeches of Seyyed Ali Khamenei on “27 September 1985” and 4 December 1988; the first speech was a lecture in Friday prayer in Muharram, and the second speech was his statements in the birthday of Husayn ibn Ali.

Articles 
"The introduction of Rejal-Keshi (book)", this article is the rewriting of the research-article of "Four main books of Biographical-Evaluation", written by Seyyed Ali Khamenei (1972), which has been published in Abdul Hosein Amini's note; this article has also been published as one of the entried of letter "R" (ر) --the 19th volume of "Encyclopedia of the Islamic World".

"Islam naturally stands against liberal democracy’s plot to dominate the world" is a speech Khamenei delivered in February 2023 where he elaborates on his view that liberal democracy stands against Islam as he sees it.

See also 
 Seyyed Ali Khamenei's letter to youth
 Ruhe-Tawhid, Nafye Obudiate GheireKhoda
 Sharh-e Esm (book)
 Nuclear Fatwa Under International Law (book)
 Morteza Motahhari bibliography

References 

Bibliographies by writer
Bibliographies of Persian writers